Louis William Merloni (born April 6, 1971), nicknamed "Sweet Lou", is an American radio personality and a former Major League Baseball player. Merloni played for his hometown Boston Red Sox from – and again for part of 2003. He also played for the San Diego Padres, Cleveland Indians, and Los Angeles Angels of Anaheim.

Amateur career
A native of Framingham, Massachusetts, Merloni graduated from Providence College in 1993 and still holds several single-season and career records for the now-defunct Friars baseball team.  In 1991, Merloni played collegiate summer baseball for the Bourne Braves of the Cape Cod Baseball League (CCBL), and returned to the league in 1992 to play with the Cotuit Kettleers. He was inducted into the CCBL Hall of Fame in 2010.

Professional career
Merloni hit a home run in his first major-league at bat in Fenway Park, a 3-run home run off of José Rosado on May 15, 1998. While with Boston, his frequent reassignments between the Red Sox and their Triple-A affiliate Pawtucket Red Sox caused local sportswriters to coin the term "Merloni Shuttle" to refer to Boston's transfer of players between the clubs. Merloni became popular with Boston fans for his local roots and reliable pinch hitting. Merloni hit .294 for his career as a pinch hitter.

After beginning the  season in Triple-A, Merloni was called up to the Cleveland Indians on May 17, 2006. Merloni signed a contract with the Oakland Athletics for the  season. He played the season for the A's Triple-A affiliate, the Sacramento River Cats. Merloni was chosen as the Most Valuable Player in the 2007 Bricktown Showdown, leading the River Cats over the Richmond Braves by a final score of 7–1. He was also voted Best Defensive Player and Best Teammate for the 2007 season. Merloni contributed a home run and 4 RBI in the game. Before the game, Merloni was chosen as the River Cats' team captain.

Radio career
Beginning in March 2008, Merloni began appearing on WEEI-AM's Big Show as a co-host. On May 27, 2008, Merloni joined the New England Sports Network (NESN) as a commentator on the Red Sox pre-game and post-game shows. After the 2008 season, Merloni decided not to remain with NESN.  Merloni was hired by Comcast SportsNet New England during the 2009 season as an analyst and reporter.

On February 28, 2011, Merloni started co-hosting WEEI's Mut and Merloni show with Mike Mutnansky. On May 27, 2014, Merloni, Tim Benz, and Christian Fauria began the Midday's with MFB show. Fauria previously played for the New England Patriots as a tight end. Benz, a former beat reporter for the Pittsburgh Steelers and radio show host in Pittsburgh, joined the show after Mutnansky was forced out due to poor ratings.

In 2013, Merloni began serving as a part-time color analyst on Red Sox radio, teaming with play-by-play announcers Joe Castiglione and Dave O'Brien for select games. In October that year, he joined Castiglione and O'Brien for WEEI's broadcasts of the ALCS and World Series.

In September 2015, Glenn Ordway joined Merloni and Fauria at WEEI for the station's mid-day program; the show moved to the afternoon drive time in July 2018. After Ordway retired in August 2021, the show was hosted by Merloni and Fauria; they were joined by Meghan Ottolini in May 2022, making the show Merloni, Fauria, and Mego. In December 2022, it was announced that Merloni would leave the show at the end of year.

Steroid education controversy
During an appearance May 9, 2009, on WEEI's The Baseball Show, Merloni claimed that the Red Sox organization had a doctor brief the players during spring training on how to correctly use steroids. Merloni claims the session did not encourage players to use steroids, but rather informed players that there were right and wrong ways to use them.  Merloni stated "It was like teaching your teenage daughter about sex education. The organization acknowledged that there were likely players using steroids and basically 'if you're gonna use them, this is how you use them so you don't abuse them'". Merloni could not remember the name of the doctor nor the year in which the briefing took place.

Merloni's claim was quickly refuted by former Red Sox General Manager Dan Duquette who stated "It's ridiculous. It's totally unfounded. ... If there was such a doctor, he wasn't in the employ of the Red Sox. We brought in doctors to educate the players on the major league drug policy at the time, at the recommendation of Major League Baseball".

Former Red Sox player Troy O'Leary was interviewed and stated he didn't remember the incident. "I remember the normal union meetings in spring training where they'd talk about drugs and steroids, and I remember doctors talking negatively about them, but I don't remember ever hearing anything like, 'OK, this is the right way to do steroids.' If that happened, I missed that one."

On May 16, 2009, ESPN baseball analyst Peter Gammons claimed that an unnamed major league player corroborated Merloni's claim.  The player, who also could not remember the doctor's name,  placed the briefing as occurring during spring training . The player is quoted as having said: "I'm not sure of the name of the doctor; he was someone outside the Boston organization. In no way did I think Boston was trying to push steroids; I think they just wanted to educate us on the subject. But you could tell by the faces on the training staff that they didn't think the doctor would say the things he did".

Personal life
In the offseasons of 1996 and 1997, Merloni served as a substitute gym teacher at Framingham High School.

References

External links

1971 births
Living people
American expatriate baseball players in Japan
American sports radio personalities
Arizona League Angels players
Baseball players from Massachusetts
Boston Red Sox announcers
Boston Red Sox players
Bourne Braves players
Buffalo Bisons (minor league) players
Cleveland Indians players
Cotuit Kettleers players
Framingham High School alumni
Gulf Coast Red Sox players
Lake Elsinore Storm players
Los Angeles Angels players
Mahoning Valley Scrappers players
Major League Baseball broadcasters
Major League Baseball infielders
Major League Baseball replacement players
Nippon Professional Baseball infielders
Pawtucket Red Sox players
Providence Friars baseball players
Salt Lake Stingers players
Sacramento River Cats players
San Diego Padres players
Sarasota Red Sox players
Sportspeople from Framingham, Massachusetts
Trenton Thunder players
Yokohama BayStars players